Patricia Rae is an American actress.

Early life and work
Rae, who is of Colombian ancestry, was born in Manhattan and spent her childhood in Queens. As a child, Rae spoke only Spanish at home, but learned to speak English by watching Sesame Street while she was in kindergarten. Patricia was a very precocious child, quite talkative, and used her humor to deflect bad behavior. Two of her main influences growing up were Carol Burnett and Lucille Ball.

Patricia’s journey into the acting world began in elementary school.  While in fourth grade, the drama teacher noticed her and recommended she be in the musical "Oliver Twist".  She moved to Florida in her teens where she resumed her scholastic activities, and with the support of the Drama club, was able to find a successful and comfortable niche in acting. Rae earned a series of awards in regional and statewide competitions with her drama troupe. Patricia went on to study at the prestigious Lee Strasberg Theatre and Film Institute.

Patricia worked for well over two decades, knocking on doors and dedicating herself completely to her craft before seeing any success in her acting career. Patricia lived much of her professional life on the East Coast where she worked in theatre, commercials, sketch comedy, independent film and TV.  Her first experience on a film set came with her first professional job securing a co-starring role opposite Don Johnson in the (1984–1990) hit TV series "Miami Vice".

After years spent in New York, Patricia moved her family from New York to Los Angeles in search of that "breakthrough" role, landing that role of a lifetime in Maria Full of Grace. Her performance as Carla, a pregnant Colombian woman living in a tiny apartment in New York with her family, earned Patricia a prestigious Imagen Awards nomination for Best Supporting Role.

Career

Film
Patricia's first two film appearances were in the 2002 movies Swimfan and Nightstalker. Rae landed her first Spanish speaking role in the 2003 movie Maria Full of Grace, which earned her an Imagen Awards nomination for Best Supporting Role. Her next two appearances came in the 2004 movie "Cut Off" & the 2006 movie "Midnight Clear". In 2007 Patricia appeared in two more films, "Driftwood" & "Crazy". In 2008 Patricia appeared in another two films, "Chasing the Green" & P.J., where Patricia was nominated for 'Best Supporting Actress in a Feature', for her role of Shelly, at the July 25–31, 2008 Action on Film International Film Festival.  In 2009 she had a small part as Maria in the movie "Dozers". Patricia had a busy 2010, appearing in four films that year: Las Angeles, where she played Linda; American Flyer, where she played the role of Maria; Caged Animal, where she played an attorney; and Silverlake Video: The Movie, where she not only played the provocative role of Vikki, but also produced the film. Beginning in 2011 Patricia has appeared in the following three films: Detachment, where she played Ms. Estrada; Tamale Lesson (Video Short), playing Blanca, and her biggest role to date, in the 2013 movie The Big Wedding, where she plays Madonna Soto, the biological Colombian mother of Alejandro Griffin (Ben Barnes).

Television
Rae has appeared on the small screen in several hit television series including Miami Vice, Chuck, The Mentalist, Third Watch, The Closer, Law & Order, Law & Order: Criminal Intent, Life and Heartland. Her first recurring role on TV was on Chuck, playing Bolonia Grimes, Morgan grimes' mother, and girlfriend to Big Mike. She also had recurring roles on The Chicago Code and on New York News, starring Mary Tyler Moore, but the show was canceled before she returned to the show. Rae had a recurring role on the CBS comedy New York News, and made brief cameo appearances in the following television shows; Law & Order: Special Victims Unit, Alias, Malcolm in the Middle and Zeke and Lutherand, where she played a tango instructor with her own school (Ms. Cordova's School of Dance).

Stage
Rae's stage credits include the one-woman show 'Under Construction', which was a one-woman show, that Rae wrote, based loosely on her childhood. 'The Making of Patricia Rae', which premiered at the 'Stella Adler Conservatory' in 'New York', 'Zoraida', 'Mickey & Roger', 'Late One Sunday Night', 'Latin Lives', 'Faade', 'Does a Tiger Wear a Necktie', and 'The Seagull'. Patricia is a member of the Elephant Theatre Company in Los Angeles, where she won a BackStage West Garland Award in 2008 for best ensemble performance in "In Arabia we'd all Be Kings" produced at The Elephant Theater.

Personal life
 Patricia currently resides in Los Angeles.
 Patricia has a daughter named Sage, who is studying editing.
 Patricia is an accredited Power Flow Yoga teacher in Studio City, California.

Filmography

Articles/interviews 
 Topically Yours - Latin actress Patricia Rae
 Variety - Patricia Rae to guest star on 'Chuck'
 Variety - Robin Williams invited to 'Big Wedding'
 Latinola - Patricia Rae Joins Cast of Movie Comedy "The Big Wedding
 Latinheat - Patricia Rae Joins the cast of Feature Comedy "The Big Wedding"
 Maria Full Of Grace - Website 
 Latinola - A Graceful Role 
 Extra 'Illinois newspapers' - Patricia Rae Considers Career a Blessing

References

External links

Actresses from New York City
American film actresses
American people of Colombian descent
American stage actresses
People from Manhattan
American television actresses
Hispanic and Latino American actresses
Living people
Year of birth missing (living people)
21st-century American women